Charkas is a village in Gavrud Rural District, in the Central District of Sonqor County, Kermanshah Province, Iran. At the 2006 census, its population was 57, in 9 families.

References 

Populated places in Sonqor County